Oquendo or de Oquendo is a surname of Basque origin and is a Castilianized variant of "Okendo". Notable people with the surname include: 

Angel Oquendo, American actor
Antonio de Oquendo (1577–1640), Spanish admiral
Carlos Oquendo (born 1987), Colombian cyclist
Carlos Oquendo de Amat (1905–1936), Peruvian poet
Constanza Oquendo (born 1988), Venezuelan fashion designer
Danny Oquendo (born 1987), American football player
Fres Oquendo (born 1973), Puerto Rican heavyweight boxer
José Oquendo (born 1963), Puerto Rican baseball player and coach
Luis Oquendo (1925–1992), Cuban actor
Manny Oquendo (1931–2009), American percussionist
Miguel de Oquendo (1534–1588), Spanish admiral

References

Basque-language surnames